Wilson Creek is a tributary stream of Temecula Creek, itself a tributary of the Santa Margarita River, in Riverside County, California. It descends south and southwest into Reed Valley, then to its confluence with Cahuilla Creek at the head of Wilson Valley. There it turns to flow westward through Wilson Valley and Lancaster Valley to its confluence with Vail Lake.

References

Rivers of Riverside County, California
Rivers of Southern California